The National Distance Education University, known in Spanish as Universidad Nacional de Educación a Distancia (UNED), is a public research university of national scope. The university was founded in 1972 under the Ministry of Universities. It has headquarters in Madrid, Spain, with campuses in all Spanish autonomous communities. In addition, there are 14 study centres and 3 exam points in 13 countries in Europe, the Americas and Africa. The University awards undergraduate and postgraduate degrees, as well as non-degree qualifications such as diplomas and certificates, or continuing education units.

Focused on distance learning combined with traditional classroom instruction (called hybrid or blended). With over 150.000 students.

Origins and methodology 
Founded in 1972 with the stated purpose of providing education opportunities via a distance education system - in which students are taught while not being physically present - UNED awards the same qualifications as other Spanish universities and has the same entry requirements.

International presence 
UNED currently has 61 study centres in Spain and - with the co-operation of local institutions - 14 international centres. These locations provide face-to-face sessions with professors once a week. The international centres are located in Bata, Bern, Brussels, Buenos Aires, Caracas, Frankfurt, Lima, London, Malabo, Mexico City, Paris and São Paulo. Additionally, there are exam points in Bogotá, Berlin, New York, Rome and Santiago de Chile.

Affiliation

In 2012 the Spanish newspaper El País featured an article about the launch of UNX, an online platform for teaching entrepreneurship through building mobile apps with App Inventor. UNED is a collaborating partner in this project, along with the Massachusetts Institute of Technology Center for Mobile Learning. The UNX online courses are intended to bring technology and entrepreneurship education about to the entire Spanish-speaking world.

Academic profile

A number of factors have been cited to justify the public prestige of UNED:
 All of UNED exams are supervised
 Exams must encompass the entirety of the program
 Students are objectively graded based on a strictly uniform test
 Distance learning requires additional self-teaching effort and discipline, highly regarded by employers
 Students from UNED are more likely to continue their education and research after graduation day, applying the self-teaching methodologies learned during their studies

In the last 30 years, UNED has awarded almost 2,000 PhD degrees.

Its international reputation is indicated in that it has held the UNESCO chair in distance education since 1997. This chair promotes research, development and documentation in the field of distance education.

Organisation

Undergraduate
Today, UNED comprises 11 faculties and the following bachelor's degree studies:

 Higher Technical School of Computer Engineering at UNED: Bachelor's Degree in Computer Engineering, Bachelor's Degree in Engineering Information Technology
 College of Industrial Engineering: Bachelor's Degree in Electrical Engineering, Bachelor's Degree in Industrial Technologies Engineering, Bachelor's Degree in Mechanical Engineering, Bachelor's Degree in Engineering in Industrial Electronics and Automation
 Faculty of Sciences: Bachelor's Degree in Environmental Science, Bachelor's Degree in Physics, Bachelor's Degree in Mathematics, Bachelor's Degree in Chemistry
 Faculty of Economics and Business Administration: Bachelor's Degree in Economics, Bachelor's Degree in Business Administration and Management, Bachelor's Degree in Tourism
 Faculty of Political Science and Sociology: Bachelor's Degree in Sociology, Bachelor's Degree in Political Science & Public Administration
 Faculty of Law: Bachelor's Degree in Law, Bachelor's Degree in Social Work, Bachelor's Degree in Juridical Science of Public Administration
 Faculty of Education: Bachelor's Degree in Social Education, Bachelor's Degree in Pedagogy
 Faculty of Philology: Bachelor's Degree in Spanish Language and Literature, Bachelor's Degree in English Studies: Language, Literature and Culture
 Faculty of Philosophy: Bachelor's Degree in Philosophy, Bachelor's Degree in Social and Cultural Anthropology
 Faculty of Geography and History: Bachelor's Degree in Geography and History, Bachelor's Degree in Art History
 Faculty of Psychology: Bachelor's Degree in Psychology

Postgraduate 

 Higher Technical School of Computer Engineering at UNED: Computer Systems and Languages, Advanced Artificial Intelligence: Principles, Methods and Applications, Communication, Networks and Content Management, Systems and Control Engineering
 College of Industrial Engineering: 	Research in Industrial Technology, Research in Electrical, Electronic and Industrial Control Engineering, Advanced Manufacturing Engineering, Design Engineering
 Faculty of Sciences: 	Chemical Science and Technology, Polymer Science and Technology, Advanced Mathematics, Medical Physics, Physics of Complex Systems
 Faculty of Economics and Business Administration: Corporate Sustainability and Social, Responsibility
 Faculty of Political Science and Sociology, 	Social Problems, Politics and Democracy,
 Faculty of Law: 	Government Intervention in Society, European Union, Fundamental Rights, Security, Insurance Law, Human Rights, Public Management, Public Finance, Public Policy and Taxation
 Faculty of Education 	Educational Treatment of Diversity, Communication and Education on the Internet: From the Information Society to the Knowledge Society, Innovation and Research in Education, Training of E.S.O., Bachillerato, F.P. and Language Secondary Teachers, Strategies and Technologies for the Teaching Function in the Multicultural Society
 Faculty of Philology 	English Literature and Culture and their Social Impact, Literary and Theatre Training and Research in the European Context, The Classical World and its Influence on Western Culture, Applied English Linguistics, Hispanic Literatures (Catalan, Galician and Basque) in the European Context, Language Science and Hispanic Linguistics, Grammatical and Stylistic Analysis of Spanish, Dictionary Development and Quality Control of the Spanish Lexicon, French and Francophone Studies, Information Technologies and Communication in Language Education and Processing
 Faculty of Philosophy :Theoretical and Practical Philosophy
 Faculty of Geography and History :	Advanced Methods and Techniques of Historical, Artistic and Geographic Research, Contemporary Spain in the International Context
 Faculty of Psychology :Methodology of Behavioral Sciences and Health, Research in Psychology, Psychological Intervention in Development and Education

People

Notable current and former academics

 Ana María Vázquez Hoys
 José Mira Mira
 Ramon Sainero
 Paco Vidarte
 César Alierta
 Javier Paniagua Fuentes
 Juan Manuel Rozas
 Vicenç Mateu Zamora
 Enrique Fuentes Quintana
 Alfonso Vallejo
 José María Moreno
 Ángel Ballesteros Gallardo
 Gustavo Fuertes
 Emilio Lledó
 Domingo Vega de la Rosa
 Trinidad Jiménez

Notable alumni 

 Nadia Calviño
 Ramiro Villapadierna
 Christina Ochoa
 Xavi Valero
 Tomás Marco
 Amaia Montero
 David Janer
 Mónica Naranjo
 Maria Verónica Reina, disability activist
 Paloma García Ovejero

Honorary doctors

References

See also 
 UNED Associated Centre of Pontevedra

 
Distance education institutions based in Spain
Universities in Madrid
Educational institutions established in 1972
1972 establishments in Spain
Universities and colleges in Spain